Henry Norwood "Barney" Ewell (February 25, 1918 – April 4, 1996) was an American athlete, winner of one gold and two silver medals at the 1948 Summer Olympics.

Born into poverty in Harrisburg, Pennsylvania, Ewell was one of the world's leading sprinters of the 1940s. Ewell attended John Piersol McCaskey High School in Lancaster, Pennsylvania.  McCaskey High School honored Ewell by dedicating their stadium in his name. Ewell was also inducted into the J.P. McCaskey Athletic Hall of Fame during the school's 50th anniversary year in 1988. Earlier in 1986 he was inducted into the National Track and Field Hall of Fame.

Ewell was the state's greatest high school sprinter-jumper in the mid-1930s, but he first achieved renown while a student at Pennsylvania State University, running the 100 m and 200 m races and winning 12 gold medals and championships in collegiate meets between 1940 and 1942. He also won 11 gold medals in AAU national meets between 1939 and 1948. He was an outstanding long jumper as well, leaping 25 feet 2 inches (7.68 m) in 1942.

He served his country in 1941–1945, returned to the university, and received his B.S. degree in 1947. He surprised everyone by making the 1948 Olympic team, equaling the world record of 10.2 in the 100 m dash at the 1948 AAU championship, which was also the Olympic trials.

At the Olympic Games in London, he thought he had won the 100 m only to learn the victory was given to teammate Harrison Dillard. In the 200 m, Ewell had another close finish and again finished second – this time to teammate Mel Patton. He was added to the 4 × 100 m relay when Ed Conwell became sick and the American team rolled to an easy victory. However, the exchange between Ewell and Lorenzo Wright was ruled out of the zone and the American team was disqualified. After viewing a film of the race, however, officials reversed the ruling, and Ewell finally had his Olympic gold medal.

After the Olympics Ewell lost his amateur status for accepting gifts from his fans, but he continued to compete in Australia and New Zealand as a professional. He also took part in the Scottish Border games circuit during the summer of 1950. He lived most of those weeks in the town of Bathgate. He won one of the most prestigious sprints on the Border Games circuit at Jedburgh. Running off scratch over 120 yards he ran a time of 11.37 secs. He also took part in a special invitation race in August that same year to mark his time in Scotland (run as a handicap race) over 120 yards at the famous Powderhall venue. Ewell from the scratch mark lost narrowly to Albert C Charles (off 12.5 yds).

Ewell died in Lancaster, Pennsylvania. He was a member of the Omega Psi Phi fraternity.

Competition record

See also
List of Pennsylvania State University Olympians

References

External links 

 New York Times: Barney Ewell, 78, Top Sprinter; Won Gold in Postwar Olympics
 

1918 births
1996 deaths
American male sprinters
Athletes (track and field) at the 1948 Summer Olympics
Olympic gold medalists for the United States in track and field
Olympic silver medalists for the United States in track and field
Sportspeople from Harrisburg, Pennsylvania
Track and field athletes from Pennsylvania
Medalists at the 1948 Summer Olympics
USA Outdoor Track and Field Championships winners
USA Indoor Track and Field Championships winners
American military personnel of World War II